The English actress Edith Evans, appeared in a wide range of stage and screen productions. After playing in amateur productions she turned professional in 1912 under the tutelage of the director William Poel. She came to wide public notice in 1924 with her performance as Millamant in The Way of the World and for the next fifty years was one of the leading performers on the British stage. She played several seasons on Broadway and made occasional appearances in continental Europe.

After briefly working in silent films during the First World War, Evans made no more screen appearances until after the Second. From 1949 to 1977 she made nineteen films. Two of them captured her celebrated stage performances: Lady Bracknell in The Importance of Being Earnest and Mrs St Maugham in Enid Bagnold's The Chalk Garden. In some films she played supporting character roles, and in others took a leading part, notably The Whisperers in 1967 for which she received several awards and an Oscar nomination.

Theatre

Sources: Who's Who in the Theatre, and Who's Who, except where noted in fourth column

Filmography

Notes

References
 

English film actresses
English stage actresses